The Minister of East African Cooperation is the head of the Ministry of East African Cooperation of the Government of Tanzania.

List of Ministers
The following have served the ministry:
 Party

References